County Line station is a derelict SEPTA Regional Rail station in Upper Southampton Township, Pennsylvania. It served a now-abandoned segment of the Fox Chase Line, and was located on County Line Road  near the County Line Industrial Park.

History
County Line station, and all of those north of Fox Chase, was closed on January 18, 1983 due to failing diesel train equipment.

In addition, a labor dispute began within the SEPTA organization when the transit operator inherited 1,700 displaced employees from Conrail. SEPTA insisted on using transit operators from the Broad Street Subway to operate Fox Chase-Newtown diesel trains, while Conrail requested that railroad motormen run the service. When a federal court ruled that SEPTA had to use Conrail employees in order to offer job assurance, SEPTA cancelled Fox Chase-Newtown trains. Service in the diesel-only territory north of Fox Chase was cancelled at that time, and County Line station still appears in publicly posted tariffs.

Although rail service was initially replaced with a Fox Chase-Newtown shuttle bus, patronage remained light, and the Fox Chase-Newtown shuttle bus service ended in 1999.

The station shed was demolished in the 1990s.

References

External links
Newtown Line.pa-tec.org – PA-TEC study on resuming SEPTA commuter service between Fox Chase and Newtown

Former SEPTA Regional Rail stations
Railway stations closed in 1983
Former railway stations in Bucks County, Pennsylvania
1983 disestablishments in Pennsylvania